The ETS Piranhas are the athletic teams that represent the École de technologie supérieure of the Université du Québec, in Montreal, Quebec, Canada. They are members of the Quebec Student Sports Federation.

They were members of Canadian Interuniversity Sport from 2003-2006.

External links
 École de technologie supérieure athletics

See also
List of colleges in Quebec
Higher education in Quebec

References

U Sports teams in Montreal
École de technologie supérieure
U Sports teams in Quebec